Fuller Heights is an unincorporated community and census-designated place in Polk County, Florida, United States. Its population was 10,467 as of the 2020 census.

Geography

Demographics

References

Unincorporated communities in Polk County, Florida
Unincorporated communities in Florida
Census-designated places in Polk County, Florida
Census-designated places in Florida